Butter Point is located in McMurdo Sound in Antarctica.  This area at the mouth of the Ferrar Glacier is straight across the sound from cape Evans. Discovered by the British National Antarctic Expedition 1901–1904, and named because the Ferrar Glacier Party left a tin of butter there in October 1903 in anticipation of obtaining seal meat at this point on their return journey. It was considered as the site of  New Zealand's Scott Base because it offered the best approach by sea and access to the inland plateau. It was not used, with Pram Point chosen instead.

References

Headlands of Victoria Land
Scott Coast